Nicolas Vachon (born ) is a Canadian male weightlifter, competing in the 69 kg category and representing Canada at international competitions. He participated at the 2014 Commonwealth Games in the 69 kg event.

Vachon also competed at the 2018 Commonwealth Games, and finally won a medal (a bronze) in his third appearance at the 2022 Commonwealth Games.

Major competitions

References

1996 births
Living people
Canadian male weightlifters
Place of birth missing (living people)
Weightlifters at the 2014 Commonwealth Games
Weightlifters at the 2018 Commonwealth Games
Weightlifters at the 2022 Commonwealth Games
Commonwealth Games bronze medallists for Canada
Commonwealth Games medallists in weightlifting
21st-century Canadian people
Medallists at the 2022 Commonwealth Games